Beijing Institute of Fashion Technology is a university in Beijing, China. Beijing Institute of Fashion Technology. 

It was founded in 1959 as the Beijing Institute of Textile Technology and was later renamed as the Beijing Institute of Chemical Fiber Technology in 1961. In 1971, it was combined with Beijing University of Chemical Technology and then in 1978 was separated from it, returning to the name of "Beijing Institute of Chemical Fiber Technology". In the year 1987, it was renamed again as the Beijing Institute of Clothing Technology.  In 2008, its official name of English version was changed to "Beijing Institute of Fashion Technology", together with the address of its official website.

The data from a statistic in 2008 says that there are 7150 students including 6017 undergraduate students, 481 postgraduate students and 59 foreign students, some of whom have traveled from Macau, Hong Kong, Taiwan, Japan. There are also students of other nationalities.  This institute is composed of 5 schools (clothing design and engineering school, polymer materials and engineering school, art design school, business school, industry design and information technology school) and 2 departments (foreign language and painting).

In the past, Beijing Institute of Clothing Technology named depended on clothing, but in 2007,
the BIFT transformed the name to Beijing Institute of Fashion Technology.

References

External links
 Official website

Educational institutions established in 1959
1959 establishments in China